The World Aunt Sally Open Singles Championship (WASOSC) is an annual competition that takes place at the Charlbury Beer Festival in Charlbury, West Oxfordshire. Aunt Sally is a traditional English throwing game played in pub gardens or fairgrounds dating back to the 17th century, in which players throw sticks or battens at a model of an old woman's head.
The tournament is a knock out competition for individuals, with the winner's name then engraved onto the Finings Cup Trophy. The 2018 WASOSC event attracted a record number of 72 competitors, travelling from as far afield as Germany.

The event returned on 25 June 2022, after being cancelled for 2 years because of the COVID-19 pandemic.

WASOSC Rules

The World Aunt Sally Open Singles Championship is open to individuals who participate in a knock out competition. Before the competition starts, names are drawn from a hat to determine the order of play. Games consist of 3 legs, where in each leg the players take 6 throws, where a point is awarded when the stick hits the doll before the iron. If tied after 3 legs, players throw 3 sticks each to determine the winner. Should the scores remain level after those 3 sticks, a sudden-death round, throwing a single stick at a time, to a winning result. The victor proceeds to the next round. Otherwise, normal Aunt Sally league rules apply and players must abide by the umpire's decision.

David Cameron video

  Prime minister David Cameron opens the inaugural 2011 Aunt Sally Singles World Championship

World Aunt Sally Open Singles Championship results (2011 onwards)

References

Annual events in the United Kingdom
Aunt Sally